Silence in the Forest is a 1955 West German drama film directed by Helmut Weiss and starring Rudolf Lenz, Sonja Sutter and Angelika Hauff. It was shot at the Bavaria Studios in Munich and on location around the city including the Hintersee and Sella Pass. The film's sets were designed by the art directors Carl Ludwig Kirmse and Willi Horn. It is based on the 1899 novel of the same title by Ludwig Ganghofer which has been made into films on a number of occasions including a previous 1937 film adaptation.

Cast
 Rudolf Lenz as Fürst Heinz von Ettingen
 Sonja Sutter as Lo Petri
 Angelika Hauff as Baronin Edith von Prankha
 Paul Richter as Kersten
 Ulrich Beiger as Diener Martin
 Käthe Haack as Frau Petri
 Heinz Christian as Gustl Petri
 Gustl Gstettenbaur as Beppi Braxlmaler
 Peter Arens as Toni Mazegger
 Georg Bauer
 Gustl Datz
 Willy Friedrichs
 
 Karl Peter Holzmüller
 Walter Janssen
 Ruth Kappelsberger
 Sybille Kaspar
 Hermann Kellein
 Franz Loskarn
 Rolf Pinegger
 Alfons Schmidseder
 Inge von Neurath

References

Bibliography 
 Goble, Alan. The Complete Index to Literary Sources in Film. Walter de Gruyter, 1999.

External links 
 

1955 films
West German films
German drama films
1955 drama films
1950s German-language films
Films directed by Helmut Weiss
Films based on works by Ludwig Ganghofer
Films set in Austria
Films set in the Alps
Films set in forests
1950s German films
Films shot at Bavaria Studios
Films shot in Munich
Remakes of German films